The Gavilan SC is a laptop computer and was the first ever to be marketed as a "laptop".

History

The brainchild of Gavilan Computer Corp. founder Manuel (Manny) Fernandez, the Gavilan was introduced in May 1983, at approximately the same time as the similar Sharp PC-5000. It came to market a year after the GRiD Compass, with which it shared several pioneering details, notably a clamshell design, in which the screen folds shut over the keyboard.

The Gavilan, however, was more affordable than the GRiD, at a list price of around US$4000. Unlike the GRiD, it was equipped with a floppy disk drive and used the MS-DOS operating system, although it was only partially IBM PC-compatible. Powered by a 5 MHz Intel 8088 processor, it was equipped with a basic graphical user interface, stored in its 48 KB of ROM. The operating system used a FORTH-like interpreter to generate very compact code. An internal 300-baud modem was standard. A compact printer that attached to the rear of the machine was an option.

The machine's included software was a terminal program, MS-DOS, and MBasic (a version of the BASIC programming language). An Office Pack of four applications—Sorcim SuperCalc and SuperWriter, and pfs:File and pfs:Report—was optional.

It was far smaller than competing IBM compatible portables, such as the Compaq Portable, which were the size of a portable sewing machine and weighed more than twice the Gavilan's 4 kg (9 lb), and unlike the Gavilan they could not run off batteries. Gavilan claimed the SC could run up to nine hours on its built-in nickel-cadmium batteries.

Jack Hall, an award-winning industrial designer, was chosen to work out the ergonomics, mechanics and overall appearance of the Gavilan. An extremely compact printer module was the result of a collaboration between Hall Design and C. Itoh of Japan. Additionally, several patentable features such as the unique display hinge and printer attachment mechanism were embodied in the design.

The Gavilan sported an LCD display with an unusual resolution of 400×64 pixels. It included a pioneering touchpad-like pointing device, installed on a panel above the keyboard. It used static CMOS memory, and came with 64 kilobytes standard. Memory was expandable through plug-in modules, for which there were four slots available (each 32 KB "CapsuleRam" module cost  and included a backup battery); these slots could also be used for software ROM cartridges.

With standards for microfloppy drives still emerging, Gavilan was designed to accommodate both a 3.0-inch 320 KB microfloppy drive as well as a 3.5-inch floppy drive. Slow sales, due to the as yet undeveloped market for laptops, caused Gavilan Computer Corp. to declare Chapter 11 bankruptcy with cash flow problems. The company ceased operations in 1985.

Reception
BYTE in June 1983 called the Gavilan "a traveling professional's dream come true ... [it] promises to set new industry standards, not only for truly portable computers, but also for integration of applications software".

References

External links
 Oldcomputers.net:Gavilan SC
 History of Laptops
 Inc. magazine article about Gavilan by company founder Manuel (Manny) Fernandez
 1984 article reviewing various pocket and portable computers, including the Gavilan
 .

Early laptops
Computer-related introductions in 1983